Dandenong and Berwick was an electoral district of the Legislative Assembly in the Australian state of Victoria from 1889 to 1904. It was located south-east of Melbourne, in the area around Dandenong and Berwick.

Members

The seat was abolished in 1904 and a new seat, the Electoral district of Dandenong, was created the same year. William Keast was the first member for Dandenong, holding the seat until 1917.

References

Former electoral districts of Victoria (Australia)
1889 establishments in Australia
1904 disestablishments in Australia